China Gates is a short piano piece composed by the minimalist American composer John Adams in 1977. (Adams soon gave this work a companion, his Phrygian Gates, finished the next year. The latter is the longer of the two and uses similar techniques, but in terms of structure the pair have little in common.)

China Gates is one of Adams' first mature works, which he wrote for the then 17-year-old pianist Sarah Cahill during a rainy season in northern California.  Adams himself has suggested that the constant eighth notes of the piece reflect the steady rainfall of the time. The bass notes of the piece form the root of the mode, while the upper voices oscillate between different modes.  K. Robert Schwarz has noted how the style of China Gates is in keeping with the ideas of "process music" of Steve Reich.

The piece has a duration of about 4:50 minutes and is written in three parts. In the first part, the modes alternate between A-flat mixolydian and G-sharp aeolian, which sound almost like the major and minor versions of the same key. The third part alternates between F lydian and F locrian. The second part alternates more rapidly between all four modes. Adams has described the structure of the work as an "almost perfect palindrome".

Recordings
 Albany TROY 038: Christopher O'Riley, piano
 Telarc CD-80513: Gloria Cheng-Cochran, piano
 Nonesuch 79699: Nicolas Hodges, piano
 Black Box Classics 1098: Andrew Russo, piano
 Naxos 8.55928: Ralph van Raat, piano
 Yarlung 79580: Joanne Pearce Martin, piano
Orli Shaham, Canary Classics, piano
 Deutsche Grammophon (DG) 00028948382897: Yuja Wang, piano

References

External links
 Boosey & Hawkes page on China Gates
 G Schirmer music publisher page on China Gates
 John Adams official page, entry on China Gates

Compositions by John Adams (composer)
1977 compositions
Compositions for solo piano